Ondo State is a state in southwestern Nigeria. It was created on 3 February 1976 from the former Western State. It borders Ekiti State to the north, Kogi State to the northeast, Edo State to the east, Delta State to the southeast, Ogun State to the southwest, Osun State to the northwest, and the Atlantic Ocean to the south. The state's capital is Akure, the former capital of the ancient Akure Kingdom. The State includes mangrove-swamp forest near the Bights of Benin.

Nicknamed the "Sunshine State", Ondo State is the 19th most populated state in the country, and the 25th-largest state by landmass. The state is predominantly Yoruba, and the Yoruba language is commonly spoken. The state economy is dominated by the petroleum industry. Cocoa production, asphalt mining, and activities related to the state's extensive coastline also are part of the economy. It is the home to the Idanre inselberg hills, playing host to the highest geographical point in the western half of Nigeria at higher than 1,000 Meters in elevation.

Government and society
The state contains eighteen local government areas, the major ones being Akoko, Akure, Okitipupa, Ondo, Ilaje, Idanre and Owo. The majority of the state's citizens live in urban centers. The prominent government universities in Ondo state are the Federal University of Technology Akure, Akure Ondo State University of Science and Technology, Okitipupa University of Medical Sciences, Ondo, Ondo and the Adekunle Ajasin University, Akungba Akoko.

Local government areas

Ondo State consists of 18 local government areas, they are:

Akoko North-East (headquarters in Ikare)
Akoko North-West (headquarters in Okeagbe)
Akoko South-East (headquarters in Isua)
Akoko South-West (headquarters in Oka)
Akure North (headquarters in Iju / Itaogbolu) 
Akure South (headquarters in Akure)
Ese Odo (headquarters in Igbekebo)
Idanre (headquarters in Owena)
Ifedore (headquarters in Igbara Oke)
Ilaje (headquarters in Igbokoda)
Ile Oluji/Okeigbo (headquarters in Ile Oluji)
Irele (headquarters Ode-Irele)
Odigbo (headquarters in Ore)
Okitipupa (headquarters in Okitipupa)
Ondo East (headquarters in Bolorunduro)
Ondo West (headquarters Ondo Town)
Ose (headquarters in Ifon)
Owo (headquarters in Owo Town)

Governor 
Akeredolu Oluwarotimi Odunayo is the sitting governor of Ondo state. Governor Oluwarotimi Odunayo Akeredolu of the All Progressives Congress (APC) was sworn-in on February 24, 2017 as the successor of Olusegun Mimiko.
The deputy governor of Ondo State is Lucky Aiyedatiwa

Politics 
The State government is led by a democratically elected governor who works closely with members of the state's house of assembly. The Capital city of the State is Akure.

Electoral system 

The electoral system of each state is selected using a modified two-round system. To be elected in the first round, a candidate must receive the plurality of the vote and over 25% of the vote in at least two -third of the State local government Areas. If no candidate passes threshold, a second round will be held between the top candidate and the next candidate to have received a plurality of votes in the highest number of local government Areas.

Ethnic groups
The ethnic composition of Ondo State consists largely of Yoruba subgroups of the Idanre, Akoko, Akure, Ikale, Ilaje, Ondo, and Owo peoples. Ijaw people, such as the Apoi and Arogbo populations inhabit the southeastern swamps close to the Edo state border. A small population of people speak a variant of the Yoruba language similar to the Ife dialect in Oke-Igbo town close to the Osun state border.
The vast majority of the population are Christians; minorities practice Islam and traditional worship.

Languages
Languages of Ondo State listed by LGA:

Mineral resources in Ondo State
The following are mineral resources found in Ondo State:
 Bitumen
 Coal
 Dimension stones
 Feldspar
 Gemstones
 Glass/and
 Granite
 Gypsum
 Kaolin
 Limestone & oil/gas

Tertiary institutions
 Adekunle Ajasin University, Akungba Akoko
 Achievers University, Owo
 Adeyemi College of Education
 Elizade University, Ilara-Mokin
 Federal College of Agriculture, Akure
 Federal Polytechnic, Ile Oluji
 Federal University of Technology Akure
 National Open University of Nigeria, Akure
 Ondo State University of Science and Technology, Okitipupa
 Rufus Giwa Polytechnic, Owo
 University of Medical Sciences, Ondo
 Wesley University of Science and Technology

Demographics

Notable people
 
 

 Mo Abudu – media mogul
 Gani Adams – activist and politician
 Kayode Ajulo - Lawyer
 King Sunny Adé – musician
 Michael Ade-Ojo – business magnate
 Adebayo Adefarati – former Governor Ondo State
 Rotimi Adelola – former Secretary to the State Government
 Tayo Adenaike – painter
 Ilesanmi Adesida – physicist
 Akintunde Aduwo – former Governor Western Region/Navy Vice
 Olusegun Agagu – former Governor Ondo state
 Michael Adekunle Ajasin – Politician, Former governor of Ondo State 
 Rotimi Akeredolu – politician
 Abayomi Akinruntan, politician
 Akintunde Akinwande – engineering professor
 Yemi Alade – musician
 Funmi Aragbaye – gospel singer
 Bamidele Aturu – human rights activist
 Akinyelure Patrick Ayo – banker, politician
 Reekado Banks – singer, songwriter
 Robert Ajayi Boroffice – politician
 Hosea Ehinlanwo – former Senator
 Omotola Jalade Ekeinde – actress, singer
 Chinko Ekun – singer, rapper
 Olu Falae – banker, politician
 Frederick Fasehun – medical doctor, activist and politician
 Anthonia Fatunsin, Nigerian archeologist
 Gani Fawehinmi – author, lawyer
 Jimoh Ibrahim – lawyer, politician
 T. B. Joshua – pastor, philanthropist
 Adetokunbo Kayode – lawyer and politician
 Boluwaji Kunlere  – former Senator
 Ayo Makun (AY Show) – comedian, Entertainer
 Nahzeem Olufemi Mimiko – educational administrator
 Olusegun Mimiko – former Governor Ondo State
 Bode Olajumoke – politician
 Chris Olukolade – army general
 Sola Sobowale – actress, director
 Omoyele Sowore – human rights activist
 Adekunle Temitope (a.k.a. Small Doctor) – musical artist
Akinloye Tofowomo, performing musician
 Waje – Musical Artist

Media houses in Ondo State
Adaba 88.9FM
ALALAYE 96.5FM
Breeze 91.9FM
Crest 87.7 FM
Eki Radio 100.9 FM
EMPIRE 104.5 FM
FUTA Radio
The Hope Newspapers
INSIDE FUTA
KAFTAN TV
Kàkàkí Òndó FM
Nigerian Television Authority (NTA)
Orange 94.5FM
OSRC Television
Positive 102.5FM
Remdel Television
RUGIPO 103.3 FM
Suncity Radio 101.1FM

Gallery

References

External links

  
 ondostatemoi.com

 
States of Nigeria
States in Yorubaland
States and territories established in 1976